William Ewing Duffield (January 7, 1922 – January 14, 2001) was a member of the Pennsylvania State Senate, serving from 1971 to 1978.

Duffield placed two ghost employees on the payroll and mailed them paychecks.  He was sentenced to six months in prison for 11 counts of mail fraud in 1981.

References

1922 births
2001 deaths
People from Indiana County, Pennsylvania
Democratic Party Pennsylvania state senators
Pennsylvania politicians convicted of crimes
20th-century American politicians